In the C++ programming language, <sstream> is a part of the C++ Standard Library. It is a header file that provides templates and types that enable interoperation between stream buffers and string objects.

References

External links
 C++ reference for std::stringstream

C++ Standard Library
String (computer science)